Glyphostoma elsae is a species of sea snail, a marine gastropod mollusk in the family Clathurellidae.

Description

Distribution
G. elsae can be found in Caribbean waters, ranging from Gulf of Mexico to Puerto Rico.

References

External links
 Rosenberg G., Moretzsohn F. & García E. F. (2009). Gastropoda (Mollusca) of the Gulf of Mexico, pp. 579–699 in Felder, D.L. and D.K. Camp (eds.), Gulf of Mexico–Origins, Waters, and Biota. Biodiversity. Texas A&M Press, College Station, Texas

elsae
Gastropods described in 1934